Dr Daniel Alexander King (born 26 February 1983) is an Australian academic who lectures in Classics and a former first-class cricketer.

Life and career
King was born in Canberra, and studied Classics at the Australian National University. He completed an MA in Classical Languages and Literature at the University of Exeter, then gained a DPhil at Merton College at the University of Oxford.

While studying at Oxford, King made two appearances in first-class cricket for Oxford University against Cambridge University in The University Matches of 2009 and 2010. In the 2010 fixture, King scored 189 runs opening the batting in the Oxford first innings for 611 for 5 declared, sharing in an opening partnership of 259 in 218 minutes with Sam Agarwal. He then kept wicket through the two Cambridge innings, taking two catches and not conceding a bye as Oxford went on to an innings victory. In his two innings in the 2009 match he had scored just 2 runs.

Since 2012 King has taught classics at the University of Exeter, where he is Leventis Lecturer in the Impact of Greek Culture.

Books
Experiencing Pain in Imperial Greek Culture (2017)
Hellenism and the Local Communities of the Eastern Mediterranean (edited with Boris Chrubasik, 2017)

References

External links

1983 births
Living people
Sportspeople from Canberra
Australian National University alumni
Alumni of the University of Exeter
Alumni of Merton College, Oxford
Australian cricketers
Oxford University cricketers
Australian classical scholars